José Rafael Moneo Vallés (born 9 May 1937) is a Spanish architect. He won the Pritzker Prize for architecture in 1996, the RIBA Royal Gold Medal in 2003 and La Biennale's Golden Lion in 2021.

Biography
Born in Tudela, Spain, Moneo studied at the ETSAM, Technical University of Madrid (UPM) from which he received his architectural degree in 1961. From the Davis Art Museum at Wellesley College in Massachusetts and the Audrey Jones Beck Building (an expansion of the Museum of Fine Arts, Houston). Moneo also designed the Chace Center, a new building for the Rhode Island School of Design. In December 2010, the Northwest Corner Building (formerly the Interdepartmental Science Building) at Columbia University in New York City first opened. Moneo's most recent work is Peretsman-Scully Hall and the Princeton Neuroscience Institute, which houses the psychology and neuroscience departments at Princeton University and opened in December 2013.

In 2012, he was awarded with 2012 Prince of Asturias Award for the Arts. According to the jury, Moneo is "a Spanish architect of universal scope whose work enriches urban spaces with an architecture that is serene and meticulous. An acknowledged master in both the academic and professional field, Moneo leaves his own mark  on each of his creations by making them a weird modern type of building  at the same time as combining aesthetics with functionality, especially in the airy interiors that act as impeccable settings for great works of culture and the spirit."

His work has been shown in several international exhibitions such as "Rafael Moneo. A Theoretical Reflection from the Profession" whose curator was his disciple, Francisco González de Canales.

Gallery

Works
National Museum of Roman Art, Mérida, Spain (1986)
Davis Art Museum, Wellesley, Massachusetts (1993)
Moderna Museet and Swedish Centre for Architecture and Design, Stockholm, Sweden (1997)
Kursaal Congress Centre and Auditorium, San Sebastián, Basque Country, Spain (1999)
Audrey Jones Beck Building, Houston, Texas (2000)
Library of Sciences, Heverlee, Katholieke Universiteit Leuven, Belgium  (2000)
Cathedral of Our Lady of the Angels, Los Angeles, California (2002)
Valladolid Science Museum, Valladolid, Spain (2003)
Museo del Prado expansion, Madrid, Spain (2007)
New Library of the University of Deusto, Bilbao, Basque Country, Spain (2009)
Northwest Corner Building, New York City, New York (2010)
Princeton Neuroscience Institute, Princeton, New Jersey (2013)
Museum University of Navarra, Pamplona, Spain (2015)

Awards
National Architecture Award of Spain (1961, 2015)
Pritzker Prize (1996)
RIBA Royal Gold Medal (2003)
Prince of Asturias Award for the Arts (2012)
Praemium Imperiale (2017)
Golden Lion (2021)

References

External links

 Architectural renderings of the Chace Center (early stages of design)
 Children's Hospital of Madrid
 Harvard University Laboratory for Integrated Science and Engineering
 The Moneo Gallery: Works of José Rafael Moneo Vallés
 "Prado museum unveils spacious new extension" (2 April 2007)
 Pritzker Architecture Prize Laureate
 Short biography at www.greatbuildings.com

 
20th-century Spanish architects
1937 births
Living people
People from Navarre
Harvard Graduate School of Design faculty
Architecture educators
Polytechnic University of Madrid alumni
Pritzker Architecture Prize winners
Rolf Schock Prize laureates
Recipients of the Royal Gold Medal
Members of the Académie d'architecture
Fellows of the American Academy of Arts and Sciences
Members of the American Academy of Arts and Letters
Members of the Royal Swedish Academy of Arts